Tatjana Sais, Lady Greene (28 January 1910 – 26 February 1981) was a German film actress. She appeared in 20 films between 1937 and 1967 and was a member of the jury at the 1st Berlin International Film Festival. She was married to Günter Neumann and later to Sir Hugh Greene.

Selected filmography
 Robert and Bertram (1939)
 Fireworks (1954)
 I Was an Ugly Girl (1955)
 The Angel Who Pawned Her Harp (1959)
 Praetorius (1965)
 Hocuspocus (1966)
 Glorious Times at the Spessart Inn (1967)

References

External links

1910 births
1981 deaths
German film actresses
Actors from Frankfurt
20th-century German actresses
Rundfunk im amerikanischen Sektor people
Wives of knights